Sosenko, Sošenko is a surname,  means 'pine'. Notable people with the surname include:

Aleksandra Sošenko (born 1991), Lithuanian cyclist
Anna Sosenko (1909–2000), American songwriter
George Sossenko (1918–2013), American lecturer and activist
Jeremy Sosenko (born 1978), American screenwriter, actor, improviser, and director

See also
 

Ukrainian-language surnames